The Jones Street Residential Historic District in Lavonia, Georgia, is a  historic district which was listed on the National Register of Historic Places in 1983.  The listing included 14 contributing buildings, all residences.

References

Historic districts on the National Register of Historic Places in Georgia (U.S. state)
National Register of Historic Places in Franklin County, Georgia
Victorian architecture in Georgia (U.S. state)
Neoclassical architecture in Georgia (U.S. state)